The Oracle is a fictional character in The Matrix franchise. She was created by The Wachowskis, and portrayed by Gloria Foster in the first and second film and Mary Alice in the third film. The character also appears in the video game Enter the Matrix and the massively multiplayer online role-playing game The Matrix Online.

Character history

In the first film, the Oracle is depicted as a cheerful old lady who smokes cigarettes and bakes cookies. She possesses the power of foresight, which she uses to advise and guide the humans attempting to fight the Matrix. Later, she is revealed to be a sapient program who is integral to the very nature of the Matrix itself.

The Oracle is played by Gloria Foster in The Matrix and The Matrix Reloaded, and by Mary Alice in The Matrix Revolutions and Enter the Matrix, one of the franchise's video games. In reality, Mary Alice played the Oracle because Gloria Foster died of complications from diabetes before her role in Matrix Revolutions was shot. In The Matrix Revolutions and Enter the Matrix, it is explained that Kamala and Rama Kandra, the parents of Sati, traded with the Merovingian, giving the Oracle's termination code in exchange for their daughter's passage into the Matrix as an Exile via the Trainman. 

Neo meets the Oracle in two different locations over the course of the film series. In The Matrix, he finds her in an apartment filled with various "potentials"—children whose ability to control their surroundings suggests that they may be The One. During Reloaded, he returns to the apartment only to find it empty, then later finds her waiting for him in a paved courtyard between city buildings. She has with her a purse filled with candies that resemble the red pill Neo took to free himself from the Matrix. In Revolutions, the two meet in the kitchen of the apartment, sometime after Morpheus and Trinity seek her advice in the living room.

In the first film, Agent Smith revealed that the first Matrix was a failure because it was too perfect for humans to accept. This has been revealed in The Matrix Online continuity as the Paradise version of the Matrix. The Architect confirms this (and his own responsibility for its creation) in the second film, adding that he also created a second failed Matrix based on human history and nature (as he perceived it without the Oracle), which has come to be known as the Nightmare version of the Matrix. By including the Oracle, whose investigations into the human psyche yielded the answer to creating a functional simulation that humans would accept, a stable System was created with the third version of the Matrix, while the Prophecy of the One made to ensure its continuity in cycles.

In The Matrix Reloaded and The Matrix Revolutions, the Oracle succeeds in unbalancing the Matrix (seeing the simultaneous rise of both Neo and Smith) to the extent that it is almost destroyed. In doing so, she manages to bring about a resolution in which the machines and the humans can coexist in peace. The Architect tells her she "played a very dangerous game" helping the humans (or, more accurately, creating Smith with the ability to duplicate himself without limit, like a cancer, both inside the Matrix and within the larger machine world and creating Neo—the only thing with the potential to contain Smith), to which she replies that "change always is [dangerous]". The Architect also promises to the Oracle that the humans desiring to be free from the Matrix will gain their freedom as part of the peacemaking between the humans and the machines. When asked whether Neo will return, she says she suspects that they will see him again, indicating that he may still be alive, that he may be reincarnated, or most probably, that Neo is part human and part software and the software part of Neo continues on.

In between the events of The Matrix Revolutions and The Matrix Resurrections, the Oracle is one of many programs who is purged by the Machines before the new Matrix is uploaded. Niobe later tells a resurrected Neo that the last message that they received from her was that a new power was rising. Despite this, the Oracle still appears in The Matrix Resurrections in the form of flashbacks.

Character analysis

Whether the Oracle's power of prediction is deterministic or not is a concept given much treatment in all three films. She herself claims that she lacks the ability to see past her own choice, explaining that no one, including herself, can see past a choice they do not understand. It becomes clear in the films that her power cannot be used to predict the ultimate consequences of Neo, who possesses free will when he defies the Architect.

Her power of foresight, on the other hand, is probably not a foresight based on knowledge of a pre-determined future, but rather a calculation; The Architect revealed the Oracle to be "a program designed to investigate the human psyche"; thus, allowing the Matrix to become more accustomed for the majority of the human population to accept. She exhibits a trait for predicting events directly relevant to the nature and/or programming of the Matrix, and natural human responses according to her knowledge of them; this is most clear in her prediction of Neo's choice between Morpheus' life and his own. While the Oracle knew that the Agents would be searching for Morpheus as he was searching for 'the One', and seeing Cypher's actions and reactions (such as his conversation with Agent Smith), she predicted the most likely event. Another example is her prediction about Neo's choice in the second movie, The Matrix Reloaded; she had existed throughout five versions, and regardless of the One's ability to exhibit free will, she had experienced a series of events that had and would occur and push the One to the Source.

In Revolutions, the Oracle hints at her true purpose, which is to bring imbalance to the equations that form the Matrix. In this purpose she is opposed to her counterpart, the Architect, whose goal is to balance those same equations.

As the Architect explains in Reloaded, he and the Oracle have very different roles to play in maintaining the stability of the Matrix. The Oracle spreads a prophecy of The One's final victory over the machines, and those humans who choose to follow this belief are allowed to disconnect from the system voluntarily. They create the real-world settlement of Zion; when its population grows large enough to become a threat to the Matrix's stability, the Architect takes action. He launches a machine offensive campaign to destroy Zion and reunite The One with the Source, rebooting the Matrix and keeping control over the humans for one more cycle. When Neo and the Architect meet, this cycle is about to complete its sixth repetition.

This Yin-Yang relationship is a form of balance between opposing forces, so it becomes obvious that the Architect and the Oracle are the two balancing forces of the Matrix itself: the fallible human factor and the logic of the machines. This idea is even hinted in the films as the Oracle is wearing yin-yang earrings throughout the third film. This process of balance between opposing forces is even more realized in the conflict between Smith and Neo at the end of the third Matrix movie, wherein they annihilate one another, suggesting a collision between matter and anti-matter.

The Oracle is discussed by sociologist Matthew Hughey as an example of the Magical Negro stock character. He writes that the Matrix is mostly presented as a "clean and bright" city full of white people, but when Neo is brought to the Oracle, who sets him on his path to becoming a hero, she is shown to be chain-smoking and baking cookies—which marks her as a stereotypical "welfare queen". According to Tani Dianca Sanchez, the personification of the Oracle by a black woman, who is robbed of her essence and existence by Agent Smith yet ultimately survives his destruction, is a rare reference in mainstream media to womanist theories of black women as liberators and saviors through their own suffering. Sanchez writes that while the Oracle embodies aspects of the black mammy stereotype in caring for white children, she ultimately represents "a radical transformation of Western denigration of black women" by acting as an othermother and teacher who challenges Western ideals of feminine beauty and wisdom; by suggesting a connection between the ancient Greek oracles and black cultures, the character also undermines traditional assumptions that white, Western culture developed independently of other cultures and races. Nicola Rehling writes that in opposition to the Architect's espousal of fate and inevitability, the Oracle introduces choice into the Matrix and "complicates the association of cyberspace with normative white masculinity" through her nature as a sentient computer program.

See also
 Oracle
 Precognition
 Prediction
 Prophecy
 Simulated reality

References

The Matrix (franchise) characters
Black characters in films
Fictional prophets
Fictional artificial intelligences
Fictional African-American people
Fictional characters with precognition
Film characters introduced in 1999
Fictional revolutionaries
Female characters in film